A bombardment group or bomb group was a unit of organizational command and control group of the United States Army Air Forces (USAAF) during World War II. A bombardment group was normally commanded by a colonel. The table of allowances (TOA) for personnel, aircraft and equipment grew steadily over the course of the war doubling from 35 aircraft in 1941 to 72 
in February, 1945. The aircrew end strength reached upwards to two crews per aircraft.

Categories
U.S. bomb groups were numbered and classified into four types: Very Heavy (VH), Heavy (H), Medium (M), and Light (L). Groups which combined bombers of differing categories into a single administrative organization were designated "Composite" groups. Bomber aircraft were assigned to groups by category:
 Very Heavy: B-29 Superfortress, B-32 Dominator
 Heavy: B-17 Flying Fortress, B-24 Liberator
 Medium: B-25 Mitchell, B-26 Marauder
 Light: A-20 Havoc, A-26 Invader

(The USAAF also operated two fighter-bombers during the period, the A-24 and the A-36. Groups with these two types were first classified as Light Bombers, then Dive Bombers, before being re-classified as Fighters.)

Tables of organization and equipment

Unit organization
The tables of organization and equipment (TO&E) for all bombardment groups were roughly the same. In 1942, existing bomb groups were expanded from three to four numbered bombardment squadrons; and most bomb groups created during the war retained this structure - B-29 groups were the exception, having only three squadrons. In addition to the flying squadrons issued Aircrew Badges, each group contained a group headquarters, a service squadron, and detachments for support of aircraft, equipment, and personnel from quartermaster, aviation ordnance, military police, chemical, signal, and maintenance companies, and from a weather squadron. These support personnel were then pooled and re-distributed among an unofficial service group and detailed for various duties as needed.

The service group provided support and technical sections for the group requirements as a whole: Flying control, Ordnance, airfield security, firefighting, Post Exchange (PX), Special Services, Mail, Transportation ("motor pool"), Communications, Radar, Gunnery instruction, Personal Equipment, and Weather (Meteorology). The service group also had its own mess section. The service group had approximately 30 officers and 300 to 400 enlisted men.

The group headquarters contained sections organized in the traditional U.S. Army structure: Personnel (S-1), Intelligence (S-2), Operations (S-3), and Supply (S-4). Including inspectors, headquarters organizations in practice totalled approximately 20 officers, some of whom were also pilots, and 60 to 80 enlisted men.

Each bomb squadron, in addition to its assigned flight crews, had a squadron headquarters structured similarly to the group's, and six technical support and maintenance sections supporting its aircraft, equipment, and personnel: Mess, Armament, Ordnance, Communications, Medical, and Engineering (aircraft maintenance). The ground support members of a bomb squadron numbered 15-20 officers and 250 to 300 enlisted men.

Functionally, bomb groups were divided into an air echelon (the collective aircrews), and a ground echelon (all supporting ground personnel within the group, including those in attached Sub Depots). Groups commonly had two deputy commanders, termed the air executive officer and the ground executive officer, to coordinate these echelons.

Personnel strengths
In 1943, a heavy bomb group had a total complement of 294 officers and 1,487 enlisted men to fly and support 48 heavy bombers; and a medium bomb group had 294 officers and 1,297 enlisted men for 64 medium bombers.

By February 1945, the size of the 125 standardized bomb group establishments had grown to:

The Army Air Forces also employed two composite groups with their own TO&Es: the 28th Bomb Group (15 B-24 and 30 B-25), and the 509th Composite Group (15 B-29 and 5 C-54). 19 heavy groups and one light bomb group were to be converted to very heavy groups for duty against Japan, but the war ended before the plan was carried out.

Footnotes

References 
 Bowman, Martin W., USAAF Handbook 1939–1945, Stackpole Books (1997), 
 Freeman, Roger A., The Mighty Eighth War Manual, MacDonald (1991) pp. 154–155. 
 Maurer, Maurer, Air Force Combat Units of World War II, Office of Air Force history (1961).

External links

 38th Bomb Group Association
 91st Bomb Group casualty list
 92nd Bomb Group website
 93rd Bomb Group website
 100thBG Forum
 100th Bomb Group Association
 301st Bomb Group Association
 303rd Bomb Group Association aka "Hells Angels"
 305th Bomb Group
 306th Bomb Group Historical Association
 307th Bomb Group Association
 310th Bomb Group
 312th Bomb Group
 319th Bomb Group
 320th Bomb Group
 384th Bomb Group Veterans website
 390th Bomb Group Memorial Museum
 401st Bomb Group Association
 444th Bomb Group Association
 456th Bomb Group Association
 463rd Bomb Group Historical Society
 Website of 8th Air Force divided by Bombardment Divisions/Bombardment Wings/Bombardment Groups/Bombardment Squadrons
 http://452ndbombgroupassociation-deophamgreen.org/

Bombardment groups of the United States Air Force